Squire Hardman may refer to:

 Squire Hardman (poem), a pornographic poem published by John Glassco in 1967, falsely attributed to George Colman the Younger
 Squire Hardman (character), a character in Sweet Ermengarde, a melodrama by H. P. Lovecraft